Arf-GAP domain and FG repeats-containing protein 2 is a protein that in humans is encoded by the AGFG2 gene.

This gene is a member of the HIV-1 Rev binding protein (HRB) family and encodes a protein with one Arf-GAP zinc finger domain, several phe-gly (FG) motifs, and four asn-pro-phe (NPF) motifs. This protein interacts with Eps15 homology (EH) domains and plays a role in the Rev export pathway, which mediates the nucleocytoplasmic transfer of proteins and RNAs. Alternatively spliced variants which encode different protein isoforms have been described; however, not all variants have been fully characterized.

References

Further reading